Chirixalus simus, commonly known as Assam Asian frog, Assam tree frog, Annandale's tree frog, and Annandale's pigmy tree frog, is a species of frog in the family Rhacophoridae found in Bangladesh and north-eastern India (in Assam, Mizoram, and West Bengal states). Among other places, it has been recorded from Rajpur in the South 24 Parganas district and in the Darrang district of Assam.

Habitat
Chirixalus simus is a reasonably abundant species. They are arboreal frogs associated with scrub forest habitats. They breed in pools, with eggs deposited on vegetation.

Description

Male frogs call from grasses about 1 metre above the water. They make foam nests that hang above the water.

References

Chirixalus
Amphibians of Bangladesh
Frogs of India
Taxa named by Nelson Annandale
Amphibians described in 1915
Taxonomy articles created by Polbot